Vanysh-Alpautovo (Wanış-Alpawıt) is a rural locality (a village) and the administrative centre of Vanyshevsky Selsoviet, Burayevsky District, Bashkortostan, Russia. The population was 446 as of 2010. There are 5 streets.

Geography 
Vanysh-Alpautovo is located 14 km north of Burayevo (the district's administrative centre) by road. Baysakino is the nearest rural locality.

References 

Rural localities in Burayevsky District